Al Amardhi, aka Wadi Alamardi, is a locality on the outskirts of Dubai, United Arab Emirates (UAE).

References 

Communities in Dubai